Godziszka  is a village in the administrative district of Gmina Buczkowice, within Bielsko County, Silesian Voivodeship, in southern Poland.

The village was first mentioned in a written document in 1618. It has a population of 2,207.

References

See also 

 Godziszka, Kuyavian-Pomeranian Voivodeship

Villages in Bielsko County